The Georgia Association of Broadcasters represents radio and television broadcasters across the U.S. state of Georgia.  It is affiliated with the National Association of Broadcasters.

See also
 List of radio stations in Georgia (U.S. state)
 List of television stations in Georgia (U.S. state)

External links 
Official website

Broadcasters
National Association of Broadcasters
Companies established in 1984
1984 establishments in Georgia (U.S. state)
1984 establishments in the United States
Communications and media organizations based in the United States